Bubble Puppy is an American psychedelic rock band originally active from 1967 to 1972. They are best remembered for their Top 20 hit, "Hot Smoke & Sasafrass".

History

Origins
Bubble Puppy was formed in 1966 in San Antonio, Texas, by Rod Prince and Roy Cox, who had previously performed together in the rock group called The Bad Seeds. Looking to form a "top gun rock band" based on the concept of dual lead guitars, Prince and Cox recruited Todd Potter, an Austin, Texas gymnast, saxophonist, and guitarist. With the addition of Danny Segovia and Clayton Pulley, the original lineup of Bubble Puppy was complete. The name "Bubble Puppy" was taken from "Centrifugal Bumble-puppy", a fictitious children's game in Aldous Huxley's 1932 novel Brave New World. Bubble Puppy's live debut was as the opening act for The Who in San Antonio in 1967.

After some lineup changes (drummer Clayton Pulley being replaced by Craig Root, and the departure of Danny Segovia), the final roster for Bubble Puppy settled at Rod Prince and Todd Potter on lead guitars, Roy Cox on bass guitar, and David "Fuzzy" Fore on drums. In the spring of 1967, Bubble Puppy moved to Austin, Texas, and signed a recording contract with Houston-based International Artists. Bubble Puppy were one of the last groups to signed by the label before its demise in 1971.

The band appeared and toured with many notable artists from 1967 until 1971, including The Who, Grand Funk Railroad, Canned Heat, Steppenwolf, Jefferson Airplane, Bob Seger, Johnny Winter, and Janis Joplin. The use of dual lead guitars was pioneered by Bubble Puppy's Prince and Potter, as exhibited in live performances as early as 1967.

Chart success 
Bubble Puppy scored a hit in 1969 with the psychedelic single "Hot Smoke & Sasafrass", which became International Artists' biggest single, peaking at number 14 on the Billboard Hot 100 and number 15 on the Canadian RPM chart. In addition to its misspelling of "sassafras", the title was inspired by a line of dialogue heard in an episode of The Beverly Hillbillies. Attempting to capitalize on the song's unexpected success, Bubble Puppy released their debut album that year, titled A Gathering of Promises, but sales were poor and the group parted ways with International Artists in 1970.

Demian
Signing Nick St. Nicholas of Steppenwolf as a manager, Bubble Puppy moved to Los Angeles in 1970. Their name was changed to Demian, after Hermann Hesse's 1919 novel, at the suggestion of St. Nicholas' wife. This was to avoid contractual difficulties with their previous record company but also because the former name appeared to link them with bubblegum music. The group signed to ABC-Dunhill Records and released one self-titled album in 1971, but its failure to perform on the charts led to financial difficulties with the label and the group's break-up in 1972. Potter stayed in California, working as a session player, before joining and touring with Rusty Wier's Fabulous Filler Brothers.

Later years
The members of Bubble Puppy continued to be active in the music industry after the band's demise. Potter and Prince played with Sirius during the 1970s, and Fore drummed with the Texas punk rock band D-Day, co-writing their cult hit "Too Young to Date".

In 1984, the original Bubble Puppy line-up reunited for performances and recordings, and they released their second LP, Wheels Go Round, in 1987.

Roy Cox founded The Blues Knights and released two CDs: Before I Go in 1999, and Road To Freedom in 2001. He formed the NYC Outlaws in September 2007 in New York City, along with Tony Saracene on guitar, Dan Curley on guitar, Cody Willard on guitar, Evan Hammer on bass, and Billy Brooks on drums. Cox died on April 2, 2013.

Reunion and 2011–2018 appearances

On March 19, 2011, three of the original members of Bubble Puppy reunited for the first time in 25 years for a performance at The Austin Music Awards. The band also added Mark Miller (guitar) and Jimmy Umstattd (bass) to the line-up. David Fore met the two while playing in Austin cover band the Kopy Kats. Fore and Miller also played together in the mid-1970s in another Austin cover band, Zeus. In April 2013, Gregg Stegall joined the line-up, taking Todd Potter's place in the band. Stegall has a long-standing musical affiliation with Miller and Umstattd, dating from the early 1970s. David Fore is currently taking a leave of absence, with Randall Maxwell on drums since mid-2018.

Band members

Original members
 Rod Prince ‒ lead guitar, vocals
 Roy Cox ‒ (died 3 April 2013) bass guitar, vocals
 Todd Potter ‒ lead guitar, vocals
 David Fore ‒ drums, vocals

Current members
 Rod Prince ‒ guitar, lead vocals
 Mark Miller - guitar, vocals
 Jimi Umstattd ‒ bass, vocals
 Gregg Stegall  ‒ guitar, vocals
 Randall Maxwell - drums, groove

Discography

Singles

Studio albums
 1969: Bubble Puppy ‒ A Gathering of Promises (International Artists)
 1971: Demian ‒ Demian (ABC-Dunhill)

Live albums
 1987: Bubble Puppy ‒ Wheels Go Round (One Big Guitar)

Compilation albums
 2000: Bubble Puppy ‒ Hot Smoke (Actual Artists)

References

External links
bubblepuppy.com Official Site
Bubble Puppy on AllMusic

Musical groups from San Antonio
Psychedelic rock music groups from Texas